The First Sudanese Civil War (also known as the Anyanya Rebellion or Anyanya I, after the name of the rebels, a term in the Madi language which means 'snake venom') was a conflict from 1955 to 1972 between the northern part of Sudan and the southern Sudan region that demanded representation and more regional autonomy. Half a million people died over the 17 years and the war was divided into four major stages: initial guerrilla warfare, the creation of the Anyanya insurgency, political strife within the government and establishment of the South Sudan Liberation Movement.

Although the peace agreement ended the First Sudanese Civil War's fighting in 1972, it failed to completely dispel the tensions and addressed only some of the issues stated by Southern Sudan. The breakdown of the initial appeasement later led to a reigniting of the north–south conflict during the Second Sudanese Civil War, which lasted from 1983 to 2005.

Background

Colonial era 
Until 1956, the British government, in cooperation with the Egyptian government (under a condominium governing arrangement) administered Southern Sudan and Northern Sudan as separate regions under international sovereignty. At the time, the two areas were merged into a single administrative region after political pressure from the Northern elites.

This act was taken without consultation with minority southern leaders, who feared being subsumed by the political power of the Northern elites in the colonial political structure. Additionally, the British colonial administration favored the Northern elites during the process of decolonization, granting them a majority of political power during the transition to independence.

After becoming independent from colonial rule in 1956, the ethnic and domestic tensions against Southern Sudan further escalated during the post colonial reconstruction. There were national concerns of political inequalities, economic development and insufficient institutions that remained hidden to the international community but ravaged Sudan internally. Also, the northern government superseded the jurisdiction of Intergovernmental Authority on Development (IGAD) by committing discriminatory violence against the southern minorities under the guise of internal turmoil of democratic growth.

Perspective

The North 
Prior to the outbreak of the civil war, the elites of Northern Sudan had two unwavering interpretations of what led to its outbreak. Many attributed such hostilities to be the remnant of the South's grievances against the British colonial administration, while others viewed it to be the Southern insurgents' attempt in challenging their ruling government. Therefore, the traditional northern elites did not acknowledge the voiced resentment and rising insurgency to have been attributed to their own governance. On the contrary, the ruling class rigidly associated the conflict's persistence to be a rationalization of the South's integration of Christianity and modernity.

The South 
Contrarily, the Southern populace viewed the emergence of the civil war to be an inevitability. Following the emancipation of the region of Sudan, the Southern elites were powerless within the realms of politics and the established government. The Southern politicians were incapable of addressing the injustice against their populace because of the minimal influence and support they had within the government in Khartoum. They were not only subjected to severe animosity as an ethnic minority but also as a religious minority within the state. Since the establishment of British colonial rule, the Southern Sudanese were introduced and integrated to the principles of Western thought. Although there were no notable advancements such as political equality and industrialization within their region, they interpreted the concepts from Christianity and the Western ideals by merging them into their own culture. Therefore, in addition to their limited representation in politics, the coercion by the Northern government and the cultural restriction in achieving progress were critical factors towards to onslaught of the war.

Course of the war

Uprising 
On 18 August 1955, members of the No. 2 Company, Equatoria Corps, of the British-administered Sudan Defence Force mutinied in Torit, and in the following days in Juba, Yei, and Maridi. The immediate causes of the mutiny were a trial of a southern member of the national assembly and an allegedly false telegram urging northern administrators in the South to oppress Southerners. The mutinies were suppressed with the dispatch of numerous troops from the north, though survivors fled the towns and began an uncoordinated insurgency in rural areas. Poorly armed and unorganized, they were little threat to the outgoing colonial power or the newly formed Sudanese government. O'Ballance, writing in 1977, says that the 'period from 1955 to 1963 was simply one of guerilla survival, scarcely removed from banditry, and that it was successful due to a score or so of former southern army officers and warrant officers, and a small number of non-commissioned officers.'

Escalation of military intervention 
The insurgents gradually developed into a secessionist movement composed of the 1955 mutineers and southern students. These groups formed the Anyanya guerrilla army. (Anyanya is also known as Anyanya 1 in comparison to Anyanya 2, which began with the 1974 mutiny of the military garrison in Akobo.) Starting from Equatoria, between 1963 and 1969, Anyanya spread throughout the other two southern provinces: Upper Nile and Bahr al Ghazal *and provided heavy pressure on the Northern army's ability to properly maneuver. However, the separatist movement was crippled by internal ethnic divisions between the "Nilotic" and "Equatorian" groups. O'Ballance writes that one of the Sudanese army's four infantry brigades had been stationed in Equatoria Province since 1955, being periodically reinforced as required.

However, the government was unable to take advantage of the rebel's weaknesses because of their own factionalism and instability. The first independent government of Sudan, led by Prime Minister Ismail al-Azhari, was quickly replaced by a stalemated coalition of various conservative forces, which was in turn overthrown in the coup d'état of Chief of Staff Brigadier Ibrahim Abboud in 1958.

October 1964 protests 
Resentment at the military government built up. On the evening of 20 October 1964, a raid by security forces on a seminar on "the Problem of the Southern Sudan" at the University of Khartoum sparked off nationwide protests and a general strike. Abboud ceded to the massive scale of civil disobedience by creating an interim government in October 1964. These events became widely known as the "October Revolution" of Sudan or the "October 1964 Revolution".

These protests included the first appearance of Islamist Hassan al-Turabi, who was then a student leader. Between 1966 and 1969, a series of Islamist-dominated administrations proved unable to deal with the variety of ethnic, economic and conflict problems afflicting the country. After a second military coup on 25 May 1969, Colonel Gaafar Nimeiry became Prime Minister and promptly outlawed political parties. Also during this time, the Anyanya insurgency took advantage of the unstable situations which enabled them to send their leaders and continue their operations abroad. Following Nimeiry's coup, Ugandan President Milton Obote ordered the end of all aid to the Anyanya.

Political turmoil 
In-fighting between Marxist and non-Marxist factions in the ruling military class led to another coup in July 1971 and a short-lived administration by the Sudanese Communist Party before anti-Communist factions put Nimeiry back in control of the country. That same year, German national Rolf Steiner, who had been clandestinely advising the rebels, was captured in Kampala, Uganda and deported to Khartoum, where he was put on trial for his anti-government activities. Originally sentenced to death, he would serve three years in prison before being released following pressure from the West German Government. The Southern politicians, on the other hand, attempted to gain more political control and temporarily established multiple provisional governments in the South. They hoped to use diplomatic means to achieve autonomy and separation but due to their political factionalism, were ineffectual in comparison to the Anyanya Insurgency

Unified Southern Front 
The South was first led by the late leader Aggrey Jaden; he left the movement in 1969 due to internal political disputes. In the same year Gordon Muortat Mayen was elected unanimously as the new leader of the South. Southern Sudan in this time changed their name to the Nile Republic and resumed warfare against Khartoum, however some of the former leader Jaden's troops would not accept a Dinka leader and fought against the Anyanya. In 1971, former army lieutenant Joseph Lagu formed a successful coup d'état against Gordon Muortat with help from Israel, which pledged him their support. In doing so, the defected Equatorian commander was able to unify these troops of guerrilla fighters under his Southern Sudan Liberation Movement (SSLM). This was the first time in the history of the warfare that a separatist movement had a unified command structure with the mutual objective to secede and build an independent state. It was also the first organization that could claim to speak for, and negotiate on behalf of, the entire south when the war ended. Mediation between the World Council of Churches (WCC) and the All Africa Conference of Churches (AACC), both of which spent years building up trust with the two combatants, eventually led to the Addis Ababa Agreement of March 1972 which marked the end of the conflict.

Aftermath and impact
Since the beginning of their independence to the Addis Ababa Agreement, five hundred thousand people, of whom only one in five was considered an armed combatant, were killed while hundreds of thousands more were forced to leave their homes. The Addis Ababa Agreement was observed by Emperor Haile Selassie of Ethiopia and led to the establishment of a regional autonomy for South Sudan. It would be known as the Southern Regional Government and would have institutions such as a Regional Assembly and Executive Counsel serving as their legislative and executive branches.

The brief interlude of peace become a relative calm and thriving period for Sudan. The agreement was able to address some of the critical grievances held by Southern Sudan to that of the Khartoum government. The immediate recognition of the region as sovereign and establishment of key political institutions were only a few examples of the major developments. Additionally, a new constitution was founded and Southern Sudan were led by localized law enforcement agencies than that from the Northern government. Despite these improvements, there was the prevention of the South's ability to have their own military and only remain autonomous under the Northern Sudanese regime.

Therefore, the agreement proved only to be a temporary respite with no definitive means of peace keeping for Southern Sudan. Infringements by the north increased social unrest in the south in the mid-1970s, leading to the 1983 army mutiny that sparked the Second Sudanese Civil War, which lasted almost 22 years and contributed to the complete independence of South Sudan.

References

Bibliography
Ali, Taisier Mohamed Ahmed, and Robert O. Matthews. Civil Wars in Africa : Roots and Resolution. McGill-Queen's University Press, 1999. .
Arnold, Matthew, et al. South Sudan : From Revolution to Independence. Oxford University Press, 2013. .
 Assefa, Hizkias. 1987. Mediation of Civil Wars, Approaches and Strategies – The Sudan Conflict. Boulder, Colorado: Westview Press.
 

Eprile, Cecil.  War and Peace in the Sudan, 1955 – 1972.  David and Charles, London. 1974.  .
 Johnson, Douglas H. 1979. "Book Review: The Secret War in the Sudan: 1955–1972 by Edgar O'Ballance". African Affairs 78 (310):132–7.
Leach, Justin D. 2011. War and Politics in Sudan : Cultural Identities and the Challenges of the Peace Process. International Library of African Studies: 36. I.B. Tauris.

 Poggo, Scopas Sekwat. 1999. War and Conflict in Southern Sudan, 1955–1972. PhD Dissertation, University of California, Santa Barbara.

 
Ethnicity-based civil wars
20th-century conflicts
Wars involving Sudan
Wars involving South Sudan
Rebellions in Africa
Sudan
Civil wars involving the states and peoples of Africa
Civil wars post-1945
Separatist rebellion-based civil wars
History of South Sudan
Proxy wars